Luciano D'Alfonso (born 13 December 1965) is an Italian politician. He was the mayor of Pescara from 2003 to 2009. He has served as the president of Abruzzo since 2014.

Biography
D'Alfonso graduated in political sciences, in law and in administration sciences at the University of Teramo and in Philosophy at the D'Annunzio University of Chieti–Pescara.

In 1995, he was elected president of the Province of Pescara, supported by the centre-left coalition of The Olive Tree.

In June 2003, D'Alfonso was elected Mayor of Pescara and was re-confirmed in 2008, though he left the office in January 2009 due to an investigation in which he was involved.

In May 2014, D'Alfonso was elected President of Abruzzo, supported by the Democratic Party, defeating the incumbent governor Giovanni Chiodi. After the 2018 general election, D'Alfonso was elected to the Senate: in August 2018, D'Alfonso resigned from his gubernatorial seat.

References

1965 births
Living people
People from the Province of Pescara
Christian Democracy (Italy) politicians
Italian People's Party (1994) politicians
Democracy is Freedom – The Daisy politicians
Democratic Party (Italy) politicians
Presidents of Abruzzo
Presidents of the Province of Pescara
Mayors of Pescara
University of Teramo alumni
D'Annunzio University of Chieti–Pescara alumni